DIAG004 is an EP by Shit and Shine, released on 30 September 2013 by Diagonal.

Track listing

Personnel
Adapted from the DIAG004 liner notes.
Shit and Shine
 Craig Clouse – vocals, instruments

Release history

References

External links 
 

2013 EPs
Shit and Shine albums